Ivan Rodrigues,  whose native place is Karnataka, India, is a polyglot film and theatre actor based in Mumbai, India.

Early life and education
Ivan was born on 23 November 1968 in Mumbai to Robert and Nancy Rodrigues. His parents though were born and brought up in Mangalore, Karnataka, before they moved to Mumbai.

Ivan was involved in school and parish plays. He made his debut in professional theatre with the musical Godspell directed by Joel Furtado and staged by St. Michael's Parish, Mahim. He completed his SSC from St. Michael's High School, Mahim in 1984 standing second in his school.

He graduated in Commerce from Sydenham College in 1989 and then did his MBA in Marketing from S.P. Jain in 1991.

After working for 19 years as a senior marketing professional in the corporate world, he quit his job in 2009 to follow his passion for acting full-time.

Career

In Theatre 

It was in his final year in Sydenham College, where he won the awards for Best Play, Best Director and Best Actor for the play The Chairs   written by Eugène Ionesco at the prestigious Dr. S. K. Muranjan intra-college competition in 1989. It was at this competition that Mr. Dandavate, who was the then Chairman of the NCPA, invited Ivan to stage The Chairs at the Little Theatre, NCPA. The play received rave reviews in the press at that time.

"A difficult play to tackle even for professionals, much more so for students, Ivan Rodrigues who also directs, did well to keep the pace brisk and the action taut. So convincing was their portrayal of old age that for a moment it was a jolt to see them smiling and straightbacked offstage". – Meher Pestonji, Sunday Mid-Day, 2 April 1989.

"Only a brave person would have anything to do with THE CHAIRS. Over two decades ago Vijaya Mehta presented it and now Ivan Rodrigues has brought it back. He chose the play because he found it difficult to understand at the first reading. Many rehearsals later he has put up a commendable effort. Both the actors retain the arthritic image from start to finish, drawing the viewer into the vortex of their grey life". – Teresa Viju James, The Indian Post, 29 March 1989.

"The Chairs is a play which extracts that bit of extra energy and talent from the actor. Its success depends a great deal on this aspect. In Ivan Rodrigues and Nilufer Charna, Bombay theatre has discovered two young talented actors with great potential. Both Ivan and Nilufer excelled, their voices and facial expressions picking up the cues from where the other had left, to give us phases of poetry in theatre. It only goes to prove that nothing can replace genuine talent". – Suma Josson, The Sunday Observer, 2 to 8 April 1989.

Since then Ivan has acted in several professional productions and has performed at venues all over India. Some of these include:

The Fantasticks, a musical play (music by Harvey Schmidt and lyrics by Tom Jones) directed by Janak Toprani and Nandu Bhende, Krapp's Last Tape (Samuel Beckett) directed by Ramu Ramanathan, In the Matter of J. Robert Oppenheimer (Hinar Kipphardt) directed by Janak Toprani, The Public Eye (Peter Shaffer) directed by Janak Toprani, Final Solutions, written and directed by Mahesh Dattani, Animal Farm (George Orwell), a musical play directed by Arundhati Raja, Holy River (an Indo-British production), directed by Etienne Coutinho and The Big Fat city, written and directed by Mahesh Dattani. He has also written AGP World's The Scent of a Man.

He has also worked with young directors on experimental plays –  like Raul Valmiki in The Date(d) and Megha Burman in Do You, I Do.

Over the years, his acting has been much appreciated by audiences and critics alike. Some excerpts.

"Apart from the adaptation, the high point of the production is the sound effects, both on and off the stage. Offstage you hear a bottle corking, liquid poured, the clink of crockery and the wheezing of a man in a hurry to get his drink. Ivan Rodrigues makes an excellent elder Krapp with shuffling feet, sharp bark like cries and semi-silent chuckles, enslaved to the clanging alarm clock slung around his neck". Review of Krapp's Last Tape by Meher Pestonji in the Mid-Day dated 4 August 1989.

"The highlight of the evening was Ivan Rodrigues' remarkable performance as the old Krapp. Slow and deliberate, never letting his concentration slip, perfectly in character whether excited or vacant, he breathes life into the play". – Review of Krapp's Last Tape by Kamala Ramchandani in The Indian Post dated 22 November 1989.

"Krapp played by Ivan Rodrigues touches the heart. The director does not see him as a comical figure but a futuristic one; spools of tape hanging out of the innards of his tape deck, the floor strewn with debris, the lights low in this each-man-for-himself world. Rodrigues has all the decrepitude of Krapp, shuffling and enfeebled, body racked by paroxysms of pain brought on by recalling the past, yet not without an ability to laugh manically at himself". Review of Krapp's Last Tape by Nandini Bhaskaran in The Independent dated 17 November 1989.

In Films 
Since 2013, he has acted in the following Bollywood films: Satyagraha directed by Prakash Jha, Shamitabh directed by R. Balki, Dil Dhadakne Do directed by Zoya Akhtar, Bharat, Tiger Zinda Hai & Sultan directed by Ali Abbas Zafar, Dear Zindagi directed by Gauri Shinde, Commando 2 directed by Deven Bhojani, MOM directed by Ravi Udyawar, Jagga Jasoos directed by Anurag Basu, Hichki directed by Sidharth P. Malhotra, Love Per Square Foot directed by Anand Tiwari, Bioscopewala directed by Deb Medhekar, Gold directed by Reema Kagti, URI:The Surgical Strike directed by Aditya Dhar, Noblemen directed by Vandana Kataria, Upstarts directed by Udai Singh Pawar, Mumbai Saga directed by Sanjay Gupta and Dial 100 directed by Rensil D'silva.

In Web Series

He has acted in the following TV and web series on Netflix, Amazon Prime, ITV, Alt Balaji, Disney+ Hotstar, ZEE5 Premium, Sony Liv and You Tube: What The Folks S1 directed by Ruchir Arun, The Good Karma Hospital S2 directed by Alex Winckler, Official CEOgiri directed by Samar Sheikh, What's Your Status directed by Madhur Agarwal, The Final Call directed by Vijay Lalwani, Made in Heaven directed by Alankrita Srivastava, Abhay directed by Ken Ghosh, Medically Yourrs directed by Abhijit Das, The Verdict: State vs Nanavati directed by Shashant Shah, Minus One directed by Shubham Yogi, The Family Man directed by Raj Nidhimoru and Krishna D.K., Broken But Beautiful S2 directed by Harsh Dedhia, Brochara directed by Simarpreet Singh, It Happened in Calcutta directed by Ken Ghosh, Kehne Ko Humsafar Hain S3 directed by Abhijit Das, SCAM 1992: The Harshad Mehta Story directed by Hansal Mehta, City of Dreams S2 directed by Nagesh Kukunoor, Tryst Wth Destiny directed by Prashant Nair and Bestseller directed by Mukul Abhyankar.

Over the years, Ivan has gained popularity amongst the youth for featuring in several Filter Copy, Dice Media and Arré web sketches on You Tube.

In Voice Acting / VOs 

Ivan is a professional Voice Over Actor and has lent his voice to several TVCs and Corporate AVs. He has also voiced for the character of Feroze Modi in Amazon audiblesSpot Dada directed by Riya Mukherjee and as Mr. Shah in Pitching Pyaar directed by Saad Khan

As Interviewer

Ivan is a professional interviewer and has interviewed many top CXOs and Business Leaders as part of the Economic Times Cutting Chai Stories. These interviews are available on You Tube.

As Compere

Ivan's background as a senior management professional helps bring insight into the pulse of the audience and the profiled speakers and dignitaries. He has the ability to keep proceedings on track and to time, as well as keep things light. He has been a Compere and MC for corporate events organized by conference producers such as Times Conferences (ET Edge), Dun & Bradstreet, Bloomberg, NRAI, UBM & EC Council.

Speech and Drama Workshops

Ivan regularly conducts speech and drama workshops for school children and corporates.

Filmography

Films

Web series / TV series

Amazon Audibles

Films / Web series / TV series - Awaiting release / Post production / Shooting for

Plays

References

1968 births
Living people
Indian male stage actors
Indian male film actors
21st-century Indian male actors